Miri Ben-Ari (born December 4, 1978) is an American–Israeli musician, producer, and humanitarian, known as "the hip-hop violinist".

Life and career
Ben-Ari was born in Tel Aviv District, Israel. She grew up playing classical music; she started training at age 5 and at age 12, she was presented with a violin by Isaac Stern. During her mandatory military service, she served playing for the Israel Defense Forces Orchestra. During her stint in the Israeli military, she heard an album by Charlie Parker and immediately fell in love with jazz; she later said "My soul was sold." Following her service, she moved from Israel to New York in hopes of using her classical training on stage and attended the Jazz department at The New School, but was expelled after two semesters due to poor attendance caused by Ben-Ari playing gigs to pay the rent.

She released her first solo CD Sahara in 1999.

Her persistence earned her an appearance on BET's 106 & Park; the viewer response netted her a return visit a few weeks later. Her performances caught the eye of Jay-Z, who invited her to play as one of the headliners of New York radio station Hot 97's annual Summer Jam concert in 2001, where she netted a standing ovation. Around the same time, a mutual friend introduced Ben-Ari to Wyclef Jean, who invited her to perform with him at his Carnegie Hall show, the first by a hip-hop artist at the venue.

In 2003, she released her second CD Temple of Beautiful, and followed that up with a live CD the following year entitled Live at the Blue Note.

She won a Grammy Award for Best Rap Song in 2005 as one of the co-writers of Kanye West's "Jesus Walks". In 2005, she released her fourth CD and first to focus on hip-hop style, entitled The Hip-Hop Violinist. As part of the promotion for it, she was part of Reebok's "I Am What I Am" global advertising campaign; Reebok was also part of the video for the first single from the CD, "We Gonna Win".

In 2006, she co-founded Gedenk (Yiddish for "remember"), an organization dedicated to promoting education about the Holocaust in the United States.

In 2007 she received the International Jewish Woman To Watch of 2007 Award and in 2008 she received the "2008 Israel Film Festival Visionary Award," "The Jewish Federation" award and "the American Society for Yad Vashem" Award.

In 2009, she released Symphony of Brotherhood, an instrumental track featuring Martin Luther King Jr.'s "I Have a Dream" speech. In part due to the song, she received the first Martin Luther King Jr. Israeli Award in January 2008 at a ceremony hosted by the President of Israel, Shimon Peres.

In March 2011, Ben-Ari was invited to the White House by Michelle Obama as part of a Women's History Month celebration, to perform and to be honored as a "remarkable Woman". In July 2011 she performed at the 2011 Miss Universe China pageant. and in October 2011 she performed at the Martin Luther King Jr. Presidential memorial dedication in Washington, DC.

In 2011, she was named by Ynet as one of the 10 most influential Israelis in America.

In 2012, Ben-Ari was invited to perform for U.S. President Barack Obama.

In 2013 she was appointed as "Goodwill Ambassador of Music" at the United Nations Association-Brazil.

In 2013 she was featured in the trance song Intense by DJ and producer Armin Van Buuren. The track was the title track of Van Buuren's album Intense and was chosen as the "Tune of the Year" of 2013 by A State Of Trance

Miri Ben-Ari is signed with the Harman Kardon brand as a Beautiful Sound artist to be featured globally in advertisements and in special appearances as an ambassador for the Harman Kardon "Beautiful Sound" brand campaign.

In 2014 she was honored with the "Aviv Award" by The America-Israel Cultural Foundation 75th Anniversary Gala at Lincoln Center for the Performing Arts, hosted by Itzhak Perlman and introduced by Jersey City Mayor Steven Fulop and CEO of Harman International Dinesh Paliwal.
Ben-Ari was a special guest feature with Arianna Huffingtons THIRD METRIC LIVE and Armin Van Buuren ARMIN ONLY-INTENSE world tour. She became a featured blogger for the Huffington and was chosen by top Israeli news media Mako and Ynet as one of the top ten most influential Israelis now living in the United States.

In 2015 Following the great success of its first year, Ben-Ari continues to promote  "The Gedenk Award For Tolerance" campaign, now in its second year partnership with Alliance for Young Artists & Writers sponsored by Ben-Ari's non-profit organization GEDENK. Ben-Ari received the first-ever "Girl Up Advocate Award" to celebrate international Women's Day from the United Nations Foundation and is the recipient of the 2015 Ellis Island Medal of Honor.

A longtime resident of Bergen County, New Jersey, Ben-Ari moved from Edgewater to Fort Lee in 2016.

In 2018 she released the single "Quiet Storm". Ben-Ari was featured by Tanzanian recording artist Diamond Platnumz on the song "Baila". The song won in 2019 "Best Collaboration Award" by African Entertainment Awards USA.

In 2019 Ben-Ari produced and released a single "Watcha Gonna Do" featuring her son Dorel. That year she started collaborating with Nigerian producer Young D. "The Beat Boss" for the project "Afrostringz'. The duo released a holiday song "Afro Christmas".

In 2020 Ben-Ari and her music partner Young D. launched the music group "Afrostringz" with a first single and music video "She Don't Know". Ben-Ari was appointed by NJ Governor Phil Murphy as a member of the New Jersey-Israel commission. In 2021 Ben-Ari became a TED speaker delivering TED talks dedicated to creativity and entrepreneurship "How to make the violin cool" and harmony & diversity "4 ways to strive with harmony]". 

In 2022 Ben-Ari released the song "Symphony of Brotherhood Rise" with superstar rapper Flo Rida and Erik E. "Smooth" Hicks, featuring Dr. Martin King Jr with the iconic speech "I have a dream", a special release for Dr. Martin Luther King Day. The song entered the official Spotify MLK playlist.

Discography

Albums
1999: Sahara
2000: Song of the Promised Land
2003: Temple of Beautiful
2004: Live at the Blue Note
2005: The Hip-Hop Violinist

Singles

Featured on
Aventura - José (K.O.B. Live) 2006
Akon - Miss Melody (Trouble) 2004 and (The Hip-Hop Violinist) 2005
Wyclef Jean Feat. M.O.P. - Masquerade (Masquerade) 2002
Alicia Keys - Fallin' (Songs in A Minor) 2001
Twista - Overnight Celebrity (Kamikaze) 2004
Kanye West - We Don't Care, Graduation Day, Jesus Walks, The New Workout Plan, Breathe In Breathe Out, Two Words   (The College Dropout) 2004
Kanye West - Late (bonus track) (Late Registration) 2005
Brandy - Talk About Our Love (Afrodisiac) 2004
Brandy - Where You Wanna Be (feat. T.I.) (Afrodisiac) 2004
Brandy, Mary J. Blige, Mariah Carey, Missy Elliott, Eve, Ashanti, Wyclef Jean, Monica, Queen Latifah, Jadakiss, Nas, Usher, Musiq, Mýa, Fabolous, Solange, Akon, Jamie Foxx, Babyface - Wake Up Everybody (Wake Up Everybody) 2004
DJ Logic - "Soul Kissing"  (The Anomaly) 2001
John Legend - Live It Up (Get Lifted) 2004
Janet Jackson - I Want You (Damita Jo) 2004
Lil' Mo - Yeah Yeah Yeah (Syndicated: The Lil' Mo Hour) 2006
 Ted Nash - Rhyme & Reason (Arabesque, 1999), Sidewalk Meeting (Arabesque, 2001)
Santi Debriano - ( Circle Chant (album) ) 1999
Santi Debriano - Artistic License (Savant, 2001)
Subliminal - Klassit ve'Parsi (Classy & Persian) (Bediuk Kshe'Chashavtem She'Hakol Nigmar (Just When You Thought It Was All Over)) 2006
Don Omar - Intro - Predica (King Of Kings) 2006
Deemi - Soundtrack of My Life 2007
Tarkan - Who's Gonna Love You Now? (Come Closer (re-release) ) (2008)
Thalía - ¿A quién le importa?
Styles P - We Gonna Win
Zion & Lennox feat. Fatman Scoop & Pitbull - ¿Dónde Están las Mamis? (Yo Voy)/Jump & Spread Out [Remix] (Motivando A La Yal: Special Edition/The Hip-Hop Violinist'')
Erykah Badu - My Life
T-Pain - Kings
Savage Feat. Akon - Moonshine
Wu-Tang Clan - Reunited
Consequence - Waiting On You
Armin van Buuren - Intense
Sunnery James & Ryan Marciano - One Life
Diamond Platnumz - Baila - song No. 8 from the album "A Boy from Tandale", released on March 14 in Tanzania.
Flo Rida - Symphony of Brotherhood Rise ft Dr. Martin Luther King

Miscellaneous, unreleased and remixes
Maroon 5 - "This Love (remix) with Kanye West"
Britney Spears - "Me Against the Music (remix)"
Consequence - Waiting on you

References

External links

MiriBen-Ari.com - Official Site
MTV artist profile
The DJ Booth: Miri Ben-Ari Interview (May '07)

1978 births
Israeli classical violinists
Israeli hip hop musicians
Israeli emigrants to the United States
Jewish Israeli musicians
Grammy Award winners for rap music
Hip hop violinists
Israeli classical composers
Jewish classical violinists
Living people
People from Tel Aviv District
Women classical composers
Women violinists
People from Edgewater, New Jersey
People from Fort Lee, New Jersey
21st-century Israeli women musicians
21st-century classical violinists
Israeli hip hop record producers
21st-century Israeli Jews